Mayak Nikodimsky is a rural locality (an inhabited locality) in Tersky District of Murmansk Oblast, Russia, located on the Kola Peninsula at a height of  above sea level. According to 2010 Census, it had a population of 3.

References

Notes

Sources

Rural localities in Murmansk Oblast